The Traitor Within is a 1942 American action film directed by Frank McDonald and written by Jack Townley. The film stars Don "Red" Barry, Jean Parker, George Cleveland, Ralph Morgan, Jessica Newcombe and Bradley Page. The film was released on December 16, 1942, by Republic Pictures.

Plot

Cast   
Don "Red" Barry as Sam Starr 
Jean Parker as Molly Betts
George Cleveland as 'Pop' Betts
Ralph Morgan as John Scott Ryder
Jessica Newcombe as Mrs. Ryder
Bradley Page as Al McGonigle
Dick Wessel as Henchman Otis
Emmett Vogan as Carter
Edward Keane as Davis
Eddie Acuff as Tommy
Sam McDaniel as Melrose
Eddie Johnson as Louie
Marjorie Cooley as June

References

External links
 

1942 films
American action films
1940s action films
Republic Pictures films
Films directed by Frank McDonald
American black-and-white films
1940s English-language films
1940s American films